The 2023 NACAM Formula 4 Championship season will the seventh season of the NACAM Formula 4 Championship. It will begin on 15 April at Autódromo Hermanos Rodríguez in Mexico City and will end on 29 October at the same circuit with the additional, non-championship, round held on 15–16 December also at the same circuit.

Race calendar

All rounds will be held in Mexico. The first six rounds will be a part of the Copa Notiauto series roster, whereas the last round will be held in the support of the 2023 Mexico City Grand Prix. The non-championship round staged after the season finale will support the Copa Notiauto's Endurance 24 race.

Notes

References

External links 

  

2023
NACAM
F4 NACAM
F4 NACAM